The Order of Duke Branimir is the 7th most important medal given by the Republic of Croatia. The order was founded on April 1, 1995. The medal is awarded for excellence in promoting Croatia in international relations. It is named after duke Branimir of Croatia.

Recipients 

Alain Erlande-Brandenburg
Ante Kostelić
Croatia's 2018 FIFA World Cup squad
Maciej Szymański
Mike Moore
Milan Moguš
Orrin Hatch
Sir Fitzroy Maclean
Slobodan Lang
W. Robert Kohorst
Wiesław Tarka
Shen Zhifei (Chinese Ambassador)

References 

Orders, decorations, and medals of Croatia
1995 establishments in Croatia
Awards established in 1995